The  is a Japanese railway line operated by East Japan Railway Company (JR East), which connects Mito Station in Ibaraki Prefecture and Asaka-Nagamori Station in Fukushima Prefecture, Japan. All trains on the line continue onto the Tōhoku Main Line to Kōriyama Station.

A branch line runs from Kami-Sugaya Station to Hitachi-Ōta Station in Ibaraki Prefecture.

History
The Ota Railway Co. opened the Mito - Kami-Sugaya - Hitachi-Ota line between 1897 and 1899, but was declared bankrupt in 1901. The 15 banks owed money formed the Mito Railway Co. to acquire the line and continue its operation. That company opened the Kami-Sugaya - Hitachi-Omiya section in 1918, resulting in the Kami-Sugaya - Hitachi-Ota line becoming the branch. The mainline was extended to Hitachi-Daigo in sections between 1922 and 1927, the year the company was nationalised.

In 1929 JGR opened the Asaka-Nagamori - Yatagawa section, extending it to Kawahighashi in 1931. The Hitachi-Daigo - Iwaki-Tanakura section was opened in stages between 1930 and 1932, and the Kawahigashi - Iwaki-Tanakura section opened in 1934, completing the line.

Freight services ceased between 1982 and 1987. CTC signalling was commissioned on the entire line in 1983.

On 13 October 2019 as a result of heavy rainfall from Typhoon Hagibis (2019) a bridge over the Kuji River was destroyed. A substitute bus service operated between Saigane and Hitachi-Daiko station. JR East announced that the bridge repairs would take until November 2020 at the earliest, but the section did not reopen until 27 March 2021.

Former connecting lines
 Iwaki-Tanakura station - A 23 km line to Shirakawa (on the Tohoku Main Line) was opened by the Shirotana Railway Co. in 1916. The line was nationalised in 1941, and closed in 1944. Plans to reopen the line in 1953 resulted in a decision to convert the line to a dedicated busway, which opened in 1957.
 Hitachi-Ota station - An 11 km line to Omika (on the Joban Line) was opened by the Johoku Electric Railway in 1928/29. In 1944 the company merged with the Hitachi Electric Railway, and a 7 km line to Akukawa was opened in 1947. Both lines were electrified at 600 VDC from opening. CTC signalling was commissioned in 1969, and in 1971 the lines became the first electric railway in Japan converted to one-person operation. Both lines closed in 2005.

Basic data
 Track: Single track
 Electrification: None
 Signalling: Automatic Train Control (ATS-Sn)
 CTC: Mito Operations Center

Services 
There is generally one train every one to two hours, but between Mito and Kami-Sugaya this increases to one to two trains per hour. Only 13 trains per day run the entire length of the line; most services are from Mito to Hitachi-Ōmiya, to Hitachi-Daigo, and to Hitachi-Ōta. Between Hitachi-Daigo and Kōriyama there are few trains, with a period of 2–3 hours during midday having no services whatsoever.

There are three additional trains between Hitachi-Daigo and Kōriyama (two to Kōriyama, one to Hitachi-Daigo), a single round-trip to Kōriyama from Iwaki-Ishikawa and back, and a single evening trip from Kōriyama to Iwaki-Tanakura that proceeds to Mito the following morning.

Other seasonal trains are added on certain days throughout the year.

Stations 
 All stations on the main line and branch line are served by local trains only.

Main Line

Hitachi-Ōta Branch 

 Passing information 
 Double-tracked section: "∥"
 Passing loops: "◇", "∨", "^"
 No passing loops: "｜"

Rolling stock
 KiHa E130 series DMUs (since January 2007)

Past

 KiHa 110 series DMUs (from March 1992 until September 2007)
 KiHa 58 DMUs
 KiHa 40 DMUs
 KiHa 28 DMUs
 KiHa 20 DMUs
 JNR Class DE10 diesel-hauled trains

References

External links

 Suigun Line travel website 
 Ishikawa Town promotional website 

 
Lines of East Japan Railway Company
Rail transport in Ibaraki Prefecture
Rail transport in Fukushima Prefecture
1067 mm gauge railways in Japan
Railway lines opened in 1897